The 16311 / 12 Shri Ganganagar Junction–Kochuveli Express is an express train belonging to Indian Railways Southern Zone that runs between  and  in India.

On 3 August 2018, this train was running as Bikaner Kochuveli Express after being extended to Shri Ganganagar Junction. It is running now as Shri Ganganagar Junction Kochuveli Express.

Coaches
The 16311 / 12 Shri Ganganagar Junction–Kochuveli Express has a total of 22 coaches which includes two AC 2-tier, three AC 3-tier, 11 sleeping cars, three general unreserved & two EOG coaches. It carries a pantry car coach.

As is customary with most train services in India, coach composition may be amended at the discretion of Indian Railways depending on demand.

Service

Routing
The 16311 / 12 Shri Ganganagar Junction–Kochuveli Express runs from  
via ,
,
,
,
,
, 
,
,
, 
, 
,
,  
,

Traction
As the route is undergoing electrification, a Ernakulam-based WDP-4D or Diesel Loco Shed, Erode based twin WDM-3A hauls the train from  till Mangalore Junction after which an Electric Loco Shed, Erode based WAP-7 takes the train towards remaining part of the journey till Kochuveli.

References

External links
16311 Bikaner Junction–Kochuveli Express at India Rail Info
16312 Kochuveli–Bikaner Junction Express at India Rail Info

Express trains in India
Transport in Bikaner
Rail transport in Rajasthan
Rail transport in Gujarat
Rail transport in Maharashtra
Rail transport in Goa
Rail transport in Karnataka
Rail transport in Kerala
Transport in Thiruvananthapuram
Konkan Railway